Mystriophis crosnieri, known commonly as the Spoon-nose eel in the United Kingdom, is an eel in the family Ophichthidae (worm/snake eels). It was described by Jacques Blache in 1971. It is a marine, tropical eel which is known from the eastern Atlantic Ocean, including Senegal, Angola, and the western Mediterranean.

The diet of M. crosnieri consists of benthic crustaceans.

References

Ophichthidae
Fish described in 1971